Llwydcoed railway station served the village of Llwydcoed, in the historical county of Glamorganshire, Wales, from 1853 to 1962 on the Vale of Neath Railway.

History 
The station was opened on 2 November 1853 by the Great Western Railway. It was erroneously known as Llwydcoed in the 1862 edition of the handbook of stations and Llurydcoed in 1867. It was corrected in 1872. The station closed on 31 December 1962.

References 

Disused railway stations in Rhondda Cynon Taf
Railway stations in Great Britain opened in 1853
Railway stations in Great Britain closed in 1962
1853 establishments in Wales
1962 disestablishments in Wales